55 (fifty-five) is the natural number following 54 and preceding 56.

Mathematics
55 is 
a triangular number (the sum of the consecutive numbers 1 to 10), and a doubly triangular number.
the 10th Fibonacci number.  It is the largest Fibonacci number to also be a triangular number.

 a square pyramidal number (the sum of the squares of the integers 1 to 5) as well as a heptagonal number, and a centered nonagonal number.

In base 10, it is a Kaprekar number.

Science
 
The atomic number of caesium.

Astronomy
 
Messier object M55, a magnitude 7.0 globular cluster in the constellation Sagittarius
The New General Catalogue object NGC 55, a magnitude 7.9 barred spiral galaxy in the constellation Sculptor

Music
 The name of a song by Kasabian. The song was released as a B side to Club Foot and was recorded live when the band performed at London's Brixton Academy.
 "55", a song by Mac Miller
 "I Can't Drive 55", a song by Sammy Hagar
 "Ol' '55", a song by Tom Waits
 Ol' 55 (band), an Australian rock band.
 Primer 55 an American band
 Station 55, an album released in 2005 by Cristian Vogel
 55 Cadillac, an album by Andrew W.K.

Transportation
 

Film
 
 55 Days at Peking a film starring Charlton Heston and David Niven

Years
 
AD 55
55 BC
1755
1855
1955

Other uses
Gazeta 55, an Albanian newspaper 
Agitation and Propaganda against the State, also known as Constitution law 55, a law during Communist Albania.
The code for international direct dial phone calls to Brazil
A 55-gallon drum for containing oil, etc.
The Élysée, the official residency of the French Republic president, which address is 55 rue du Faubourg-Saint-Honoré in Paris.

See also
55th Regiment of Foot (disambiguation)
Channel 55 (disambiguation)
Type 55 (disambiguation)
Class 55 (disambiguation)
List of highways numbered 55

References 

Integers